Sekolah Menengah Sains Tengku Muhammad Faris Petra (abbreviated SMSTMFP; previously known as Sekolah Menengah Sains Kelantan (1973–1986) and Sekolah Menengah Tengku Muhammad Faris Petra (1986–1995)) is a premier government-funded secondary boarding school (Sekolah Berasrama Penuh) in Pengkalan Chepa in the state of Kelantan, Malaysia, for selected students aged thirteen to seventeen. Its students bear the name Farisian. The school is named after Tengku Muhammad Faris Petra, Kelantanese prince (later become Sultan of Kelantan).

Established in 1973 under the Second Malaysia Plan in accordance of Malaysian New Economic Policy, the school is located about 9 km northeast of the state capital, Kota Bharu and about 1.5 km southeast of the Sultan Ismail Petra Airport. In 2011, the school was awarded with the Sekolah Berprestasi Tinggi or High Performance School  title, a title awarded to schools in Malaysia that have met stringent criteria including academic achievement, strength of alumni, international recognition, network and linkages. In the 2011 PMR examination, the school produced 112 students with straight A's out of 148 (75.68%) with GPS of 1.05 and become the best in Kelantan.

Faris Petra focuses predominantly on natural and pure science subjects such as Biology, Chemistry and Physics. However, a range of additional subjects are offered for interested students including Principles of Accounting and Visual Arts in SPM. Other than science, it is mandatory to each student to learn a third language from the choice of Arabic, French, Mandarin or Japanese. Students are allowed to take more than one extra language.

In the non-academic field, the school declared its niche areas in hockey, golf, traditional Malay musical orchestra. The school also produced a number of athletes competing in track and fields at state, national and international level.

History
Faris Petra is one of the ten new residential science schools built by the Malaysian Government in the wake of the 1971 Malaysian New Economic Policy to give education with a science bias to selected pupils, predominantly Malays.  Its original name was Sekolah Menengah Sains Kelantan, which means Kelantan Secondary Science School.

It officially opened in 1973 with six classes and eleven teachers, but the students had to reside in the nearby Sekolah Menengah Ismail Petra (SMIP) until the present campus was ready at the start of 1974.

In 1986 the name was changed to Tengku Muhammad Faris Petra Science Secondary School, named after the crown prince of Kelantan, His Royal Highness Tengku Muhammad Faris Petra.

In 2012, the school have been honoured with Premier SBP title which grant itself to stand tall with other premier SBP such as MCKK, STF and STAR.

In 2016, the school have been chosen as IB Middle Years Programme world school.

Houses of Excellence 
As a part of the enrolment process, students are sorted into the four main "Houses of Excellence" system, each bearing the name of former Minister of Education of Malaysia: Mahathir Mohamad , Hussein Onn, Abdul Rahman and Abdul Razak. The four houses are also distinguished by their house colours which each of its member would don in inter-house events and decorate their dormitories with. Students dormitories and seats in the dining hall are allocated based on these houses as well. Although each house is put under the authority a group of teachers, it is also governed by their own student body with the Head of the House usually a member of the School Prefects Board. The houses would compete against each other throughout the year by gaining and losing points in various aspects and to ultimately win the House Cup as well as the other categorical awards in Academics, Sports, Disciplines and 3K.

The houses with their colours are as follows:
 House of Mahathir (Blue)
 House of Hussein (Red)
 House of Rahman (Yellow)
 House of Razak (Green)

Awards and Titles 
The school received some recognitions for its performance. The awards are as follows:
 High Performance School (Sekolah Berprestasi Tinggi) - Second Cohort
 Cluster of Excellence School (Sekolah Kluster) - First Cohort
 Smart School (Sekolah Bestari)
 Best Fully Residential School Award (2007)
 International Baccalaureate World School (MYPIB World School) (2016)

Notable alumni
 Hamim Samuri, Member of Parliament for Ledang in Johor state.

The former students' association (also known as FARIS PETRA) showed their appreciation to the school by contributing a fund to built a mosque in 2004. All the costs of RM 600,000 were borne by the fund collected from alumni and school's Parent-Teacher Association..Earlier, alumni association acronyms were SEMESTA later changed to FARISAINS in 2009 to better reflect the school's name. Then, in 2012, the acronym was changed again to FARIS PETRA.

References

External links
 Official website
 Official website of FARIS PETRA - Alumni Association of SMSTMFP

1973 establishments in Malaysia
Educational institutions established in 1973
Co-educational boarding schools
International Baccalaureate schools in Malaysia
Kota Bharu District